The 65th Infantry Division (65-ya Pekhotnaya Diviziya) was an infantry formation of the Russian Imperial Army.

Organization
1st Brigade
257th Infantry Regiment
258th Infantry Regiment
2nd Brigade
259th Infantry Regiment
260th Infantry Regiment

References

Infantry divisions of the Russian Empire